Rogue Trooper is a third-person shooter video game developed by Rebellion Developments and published by Eidos Interactive. It was released for Microsoft Windows, PlayStation 2 and Xbox in 2006. The Wii version, entitled Rogue Trooper: Quartz Zone Massacre, was released in 2009.

The game uses several story and plot elements from the original comic. This is the second game Rebellion Developments produced based on characters from the pages of 2000 AD; the first being Judge Dredd: Dredd vs. Death in 2003.

A remastered version of the game was released on 17 October 2017 for Microsoft Windows, PlayStation 4, Xbox One and Nintendo Switch, titled Rogue Trooper Redux.

Story
The story is set on the planet Nu-Earth, which is caught in the gravitational forces of two suns and a black hole (used by Southers to warp into their space station high command), where a perpetual war between the Norts and Southers is being fought, in which millions have been killed. During the war all forms of chemical and biological weapons have been used, poisoning the planet, and the troops of both sides must live in enclosed cities and only venture into the outside if wearing protective gear known as a "bio-suit". The Southers have, through genetic engineering (done by the so-called "gene genies"), developed a race of warriors who are immune to the deadly atmosphere and will therefore be superior troops, the Genetic Infantry. All of the G.I.s were made immune to all toxins, diseases, and acids (except for one). The Souther High Command deploy their secret weapon in an airborne assault, but a traitor has betrayed the secret of the G.I.s to the Norts and they are massacred during the drop. This is known as the Quartz Zone Massacre.

Rogue, apparently the only surviving G.I. (until he meets Venus Bluegenes), goes AWOL in order to track down the Traitor General responsible and avenge the rest of the G.I.s. Along the way he thwarts numerous Nort schemes, destroys some of Nort-land's highest personnel, such as Grand Admiral Hoffa and Sergeant-Kaptain Natashov.

All G.I.s possess a biochip implanted inside of the skull that contains their personality traits, memories and consciousness. After a G.I. dies his biochip can be inserted in a slot in another G.I's equipment or weapon, enabling him to control it. The biochip can later be placed into a new body, allowing the fallen G.I. to be reborn but they must be saved within 60 seconds after they died or their biochip will burnout killing the G.I. permanently. One quotation is "we're genetic infantry – even when we're dead we don't escape from war."

Gameplay
The game is a third-person shooter. Rogue's primary arsenal are his pistol and assault rifle, with the latter being upgradeable throughout the course of the game. The rifle may be outfitted with a silencer at any time, or deployed as a sentry turret. As the game progresses the player unlocks the ability to outfit the rifle with a sniper attachment, a shotgun attachment, a cluster mortar attachment, an anti-aircraft rocket launcher, and an electric beam rifle. Other weapons include deployable micro mines, incendiary grenades, scrambler grenades, fragmentation and sticky grenades plus heavy machine gun posts and flak cannons scattered across the field with occasional use of  rocket launchers and hell cannons.

Rogue's survival is ensured through clever use of the battlefield, which is generally rife with cover. He is able to fire while stationary, on the run, crouching, diving, and around the corner of any form of cover. Rogue also has the ability to unleash suppressive fire, which consumes a small amount of ammo and fires blindly from cover to intimidate enemies and cause them to find cover of their own. Enemies are highly susceptible to headshots, which will generally down them in a single strike. Another feature of gunplay is the ability to shoot an enemy soldier's air tank. Targeting the head displays a skull and crossbones, while targeting the gas tank shows a rectangular shape. Penetrating an air tank will cause enemies to run frantically and then explode, damaging any other enemies nearby.

Rogue may search fallen enemy and ally bodies to recover Salvage, the game's main resource, and a necessity for purchasing any of Bagman's supplies. Salvage is used to create all forms of ammunition and grenades, med-kits and arsenal upgrades. Scrap piles may also be found and looted for a considerable amount of Salvage.

Reception

Rogue Trooper

Rogue Trooper and Rogue Trooper: Quartz Zone Massacre received average to positive reviews on all platforms according to the review aggregation website Metacritic.

The Times gave it a score of four stars out of five and called it "a third-person shooter with smooth, detailed graphics, and a learning curve set so beautifully that even non-shooter fans should love it." The A.V. Club gave it a B and said that it "doesn't approach the inventiveness of a great budget TPS like last year's Raze's Hell, but it's priced to move." However, The Sydney Morning Herald gave it a score of three stars out of five and said, "Where Rogue Trooper rescues itself from mediocrity ... is in the way it utilises Gunnar, Helm and Bagman. They all perk up with humorous quips and helpful advice, while the futuristic gadgetry is inventive." Detroit Free Press gave it two stars out of four and said it "feels more like basic training than hardcore warfare." Computer Games Magazine gave the PC version two-and-a-half stars out of five and said, "Everything about Rogue Trooper screams 'competent,' which doesn't amount to memorable or particularly inspired." Computer Gaming World gave it an unfavourable review and said, "If you take a game that's composed entirely of canned set pieces—say, Rogue Trooper—and play it over and over and over, you're going to make yourself hate it. I liked it only mildly enough the first time. So it just goes to show that in a game this thin, familiarity breeds contempt."

Awards
In 2006 the screenplay, written by Gordon Rennie, and the character Rogue were both nominated for BAFTAs.

Rogue Trooper Redux

The Redux edition received more mixed reviews than the original Rogue Trooper on all platforms according to Metacritic.

Awards
The Redux edition was nominated for the "Best Action and Adventure Game" and "Heritage" awards at The Independent Game Developers' Association Awards 2018.

References

External links
 
 

2006 video games
Nintendo Switch games
PlayStation 2 games
PlayStation 4 games
Rogue Trooper
Rebellion Developments games
Third-person shooters
Video games based on comics
Video games developed in the United Kingdom
Video games set on fictional planets
Wii games
Windows games
Xbox games
Xbox One games
Multiplayer and single-player video games
Stealth video games
Reef Entertainment games
Eidos Interactive games